The Northern Pikes are a Canadian rock band formed in Saskatoon, Saskatchewan, in 1984. The original members are Jay Semko, Bryan Potvin, Merl Bryck and Glen Hollingshead, who left the band in 1985 and was replaced by Don Schmid in June 1986.

The band was active until 1993 and toured and recorded again from 1999 through to the present.

The Northern Pikes were inducted into the Western Canadian Music Hall of Fame on Sunday, September 30, 2012, in Regina, Saskatchewan.

The band released its ninth record of original material, Forest of Love, on June 7, 2019.

History
The Northern Pikes released two independent EPs before being signed to Virgin Records in 1986, The Northern Pikes (1984) and Scene in North America (1985). They also recorded a song for Saskatchewan After Dark, a 1985 compilation of Saskatchewan-based artists sponsored by the provincial government. Their first album for Virgin, Big Blue Sky, included the Semko-penned "Teenland", the band's first significant hit.  The follow-up album Secrets of the Alibi contained three Canadian hits, "Wait for Me", "Let's Pretend" & "Hopes Go Astray".

Their 1990 album Snow in June became their biggest seller in Canada and the US. That album's lead single, "She Ain't Pretty", was the band's biggest hit, and was written by Potvin. An innovative music video for that song received heavy play on MuchMusic and was nominated for a Juno Award in 1991. Overall, the band has been nominated for five Juno Awards, but have yet to record a win.

In early 1992, the band released the single "Everyone's a Hero" for the Canadian Special Olympics. Later that year, the band released their next album, Neptune. The album's biggest hit, "Believe", was written by Potvin.  After touring to support the album, they announced their retirement as a group in July 1993.

In 1999, Virgin Records asked the band members for their input on a "greatest hits" package. The band decided to do a short promotional tour following the release of Hits and Assorted Secrets 1984-1993, but found themselves enjoying the more relaxed independence of making their own schedule that they continued touring.  They have since released three independent albums, including Truest Inspiration (2001) and It's a Good Life (2003), as well as the aptly titled Live (2000).

In 2005, the band struck up a musical collaboration with Les Stroud. Throughout 2005 and 2006 they performed together live several times.  A six-song EP born from this collaboration entitled Long Walk Home was released in the spring of 2007, and was credited to "Les Stroud & The Pikes".

In 2006, Merl Bryck made the decision to curtail his touring schedule, and left the Northern Pikes.  Long-time sideman Ross Nykiforuk joined the band on keyboards as the fourth member onstage from 2006–2011.  Since then, Semko, Potvin and Schmid have continued touring under the Northern Pikes banner as, in their own words, a "power trio". In 2017, Grapes of Wrath guitarist Kevin Kane joined them for their 30th Anniversary of "Big Blue Sky" Tour, becoming a full-time member of the band in 2018 for the recording of Forest Of Love. The 10-track record is the band's first in 16 years and also features original members Semko, Schmid and Potvin. BlueFrog Studios hosted the band for two official pre-release concerts on June 6, 2019, which were viewed via Facebook Live and YouTube Live. The band began working on a new album in early 2020, which Jay Semko described as a "tribute to Snow in June'''" but postponed finishing it due to travel restrictions and difficulty getting together in studio due to the Covid pandemic. They plan to finish it and have it out by 2022.

In 2019, Semko recorded a new version of the band's 1987 single "The Things I Do for Money", in collaboration with cellists Theodor and Maximilian Aoki, for the soundtrack to Warren P. Sonoda's feature film Things I Do for Money.

Discography
Studio albums
 1987 – Big Blue Sky 1988 – Secrets of the Alibi 1990 – Snow in June 1992 – Neptune 2001 – Truest Inspiration 2003 – It's a Good Life 2019 – Forest of LoveIndependently-released EPs
 1984 – The Northern Pikes 1985 – Scene in North AmericaCollaborative EP
 2007 – Les Stroud & the Pikes: Long Walk HomeLive albums
 1993 – Gig 2000 – LiveCompilations
 1999 – Hits and Assorted Secrets 1984-1993 2007 – PlatinumAppearances
 1985 – Saskatchewan After Dark'' (track "Working in My Head")

Singles

References
Citations

External links
 The Northern Pikes Official Site
 Northern Pikes CanConRox entry  
 The Northern Pikes at MySpace
 The Northern Pikes entry at JAM! The Canadian Pop Encyclopedia
 Jay Semko interview discussing The Northern Pikes

Musical groups established in 1984
Musical groups disestablished in 1993
Musical groups reestablished in 1999
Musical groups from Saskatoon
Canadian alternative rock groups
1984 establishments in Saskatchewan
1993 disestablishments in Saskatchewan
1999 establishments in Saskatchewan
Virgin Records artists
Scotti Brothers Records artists